Georges Ramoulux (24 October 1920 – 5 November 2013) was a French racing cyclist. He rode in the 1948 and 1949 Tour de France.

References

External links

1920 births
2013 deaths
French male cyclists
People from Rueil-Malmaison